Antonella Colonna Vilasi is the President of the Research Center on Intelligence in Rome -Italy- UNI.

She was the first European author to have published a trilogy on intelligence issues. She collaborates with numerous scientific journals, with articles on intelligence and security. She teaches in a number of intelligence Agencies and Universities. Her many books have mostly been published in Italian, with some translations

Bibliography
 I crimini internazionali, 2008, Edizioni Univ. Romane, .
 Intelligence, 2008, Arte, .
 Segreto di Stato e Intelligence, 2008, Edizioni Univ. Romane, .
 Intelligence. Nuove minacce e terrorismo, 2008, Edizioni Univ. Romane, .
 Ndrangheta. I mille volti di un sistema criminale, 2008, Edizioni Univ. Romane, .
 Il bullismo, 2008, Arte Tipografica, .
 Europol e cooperazione fra gli organi di polizia degli stati membri dell'Unione Europea in materia di criminalità, 2008, Edizioni Univ. Romane, .
 Un conflitto atipico, 2008, Edizioni Univ. Romane, .
 Il mercato dell'energia in Italia, 2008, Arte Tipografica, .
 Crimine e onore, 2008, Edizioni Univ. Romane, .
 Note di criminologia femminile, 2008, Edizioni Univ. Romane, .
 Frammenti di diritto pubblico generale, 2008, Edizioni Univ. Romane, .
 La grafologia, 2008, Edizioni Univ. Romane, .
 Le testimonianze dei bambini, 2008, Edizioni Univ. Romane, .
 Il terrosimo marittimo, 2008, Edizioni Univ. Romane, .
 Il terrorismo, 2009, Mursia, .
 Roma da scrivere, 2010, Drengo, .
 Manuale di educazione degli adulti, 2010, QuiEdit, .
 Pedagogia sociale. Figure del disordine quotidiano, 2010, Pensa Editore, .
 Pedagogia sociale. Scritti di pedagogia sociale contemporanea, 2010 Pensa Editore, .
 Scrivere degli altri e di se'. La biografia tra scienza, arte e memoria, 2010, Fond. Buttitta
 Il recupero sociale, 2010, Il Filo, .
 Manuale di intelligence, 2011, Città del Sole ed., .
 Islam tra pace e guerra, 2011, Città del Sole ed., .
 Io, figlio parricida, 2011, Iris, .
 Mafie. Origini e sviluppo del fenomeno mafioso, 2012, Dissensi ed., .
 Etnografie, 2012, Aracne ed.
 Un eroe italiano, 2012, Neftasia ed., .
 Reportage dal Libano. Tra guerre, servizi segreti e primavera Araba, 2012, Satweiss ed. Germania
 Ricette di spie. Gastrocultura di intelligence, 2012, Satweiss ed. Germania
 The History of MI-6, Simon&Schuster
 Storia dell'MI6, Sovera ed.
 Storia dei servizi segreti italiani. Dall'Unità d'Italia alle sfide del XXI secolo, Citta' del Sole edizioni
 The History of Mossad, Penguin
 La storia del Mossad, Sovera edizioni
 Intelligence. Evoluzione e funzionamento dei servizi segreti, Libellula edizioni
 Le Agenzie mondiali di Intelligence, '''Trilogia, Libellula edizioni
 Reportage dall'Egitto. Tra rivoluzioni mancate, servizi segreti e primavere arabe, Libellula edizioni
 Storie di intelligence, Libellula edizioni
 Spystory-ll fango e la gloria, Romanzo Robin edizioni
 The history of the Cia, Penguin Group Publishing UK Release
 The history of the Cia,'' Penguin Group Publishing USA Release

Awards
 Parole e poesia Italian Award (2008)
 Premio Nabokov Italian Award (2009)
 Premio Moica Italian Award (2009)
 Premio Giovanni Gronchi Italian Award (2009)
 Premio Tindari Italian Award (2010)
 Premio Pennino d'Oro Italian Award (2010)
 Premio La Rocca d'Oro Italian Award (2010)
 Città di Anagni Italian Award (2010)
 Giovanni Gronchi Italian Award (2010)
 Firenze Capitale d'Europa Italian Award (2010)

References

21st-century Italian historians
Italian women writers
Living people
Year of birth missing (living people)
People from Viterbo